Salud, dinero y amor (English title: Health, money and love) is a Mexican telenovela produced by Emilio Larrosa for Televisa in 1997–1998. Is a sequel of 1995 Mexican telenovela El premio mayor.

On August 4, 1997, Canal de las Estrellas started broadcasting Salud, dinero y amor weekdays at 10:00pm, replacing Pueblo chico, infierno grande. The last episode was broadcast on January 2, 1998 with Volver a empezar replacing it the following day.

Carlos Bonavides, Itatí Cantoral and Eduardo Santamarina starred as protagonists, while Frances Ondiviela, Martha Julia, Maribel Fernández, Héctor Suárez Gomis, Laura Forastieri and Sergio Klainer starred as antagonists. Mónica Dossetti, Arath de la Torre and Dinorah Cavazos starred as stellar performances.

Cast 
 
Itatí Cantoral as Estrella Pérez Jiménez
Eduardo Santamarina as Dr. Jorge Miguel Fontanot
Carlos Bonavides as Luis "Huicho" Domínguez López
Frances Ondiviela as Adriana Rivas Cacho de Fontanot
Sergio Kleiner as Dr. Damián Zárate
Maribel Fernández as Celia "La Condesa" Jiménez Vda. de Pérez
Martha Julia as Consuelo Flores de Domínguez/de Zárate
Mónica Dossetti as Karla Greta Reyes Retana y de las Altas Torres
Héctor Suárez Gomis as El Tacubayo
Arath de la Torre as Francisco José "Pancho" Martínez
Laura Forastieri as Dalilah
Dinorah Cavazos as Leticia "La China" Martínez
Leonor Llausás as Doña Anita López de Domínguez
Óscar Vallejo as Enrique "Quique" Domínguez Molina
Sergio DeFassio as Cosme Gutiérrez
Bobby Larios as Sebastián
Ricardo Silva as Agustín Villagrán
Alfonso Mier y Terán as Tobi Reyes Retana y de las Altas Torres
Magdalena Cabrera as Fulgencia Pérez
Claudia Vega as Mercedes/Edwina
Alberto Mayagoitia as Federico Montiel
Guillermo García Cantú as Felipe
Kitty de Hoyos as María Cristina de Montiel
Gustavo Rojo as Don Federico Montiel
Tania Prado as Malena Sánchez
Sharis Cid as Lidia Rivas Cacho
Anghel as Etelvina
José Luis Rojas as Hipólito "Cachito"
Samuel Gallegos as El Darvader
José María Calvario as El Cacahuate
Paola Flores as Rufina
Radamés de Jesús as Giorgio
Consuelo Duval as Carolina
Alea Yolotl as Juventina
Gabriela Arroyo as Reina Sánchez de Reyes Retana
Irina Areu as Tracy Smith
Antonio Escobar as Rodrigo
Fernando Manzano as El Hidráulico
Rodolfo de Alejandre as Pollo
Sylvia Valdés as Ruperta
José Antonio Iturriaga as Nemesio
Arturo Muñoz as Pedro
Miguel Serros as Tony
Nelly Horsman as Jorge Miguel's mother
Manola Diez as Lorena
Joana Brito as Mother Superior
Sheyla as Sister Dominga
Marichelo as Sister Inés
Monica Riestra as Secretary agency underwear
Julio Mannino as Ricardo
Enrique Hidalgo as Doctor Cabrera
Andrea Torre as Adriana Rivas Cacho (teenager)
Rubén Morales as Adriana's father
Odemaris Ruiz as Estrella Pérez (child)
Genoveva Pérez as Refugio
Polo Salazar as Cobarrubias
Perla Jasso as Claudia
Juan Ángel Esparza as Eugenio
Adriana Rojo as Social worker
Eduardo Cuervo as Daniel
Jacqueline Arroyo as Huicho's lover
Mayra Murrieta as Esperanza
Ingrid Martz as Ingrid Sandoval
Ivonne Montero as Ivonne Sanchéz

Awards

References

External links

1997 telenovelas
Mexican telenovelas
1997 Mexican television series debuts
1998 Mexican television series endings
Spanish-language telenovelas
Television shows set in Mexico City
Televisa telenovelas